The men's tournament of the 2011 European Curling Championships took place in Moscow, Russia from December 2 to 10. The winners of the Group C tournament in Tarnby, Denmark, Poland and Lithuania, moved on to the Group B tournament.
The top seven men's teams at the 2011 European Curling Championships, Sweden, Norway, Denmark, the Czech Republic, Germany, Scotland, and France, will join hosts Switzerland in representing their respective nations at the 2012 Capital One World Men's Curling Championship in Basel. France played Russia in the World Challenge Games, where France defeated Russia after two games in a best-of-three series to win the final berth.

In the Group A competitions, round robin play finished with three teams tied at first and four teams tied at fourth. The Czech Republic emerged victorious from the four-way tiebreaker to qualify for the playoffs. The page playoffs saw Sweden slip past defending champions Norway and the Czech Republic edge Denmark, last year's runners-up. Norway soundly defeated the Czech Republic in the semifinal with a score of 5–2, and the Czech Republic dropped to the bronze medal game. The Czechs, skipped by Jiří Snítil, fell to Denmark's Rasmus Stjerne, who led his team in a 9–6 victory over Snítil and team. The final saw Sweden's Niklas Edin face Norway's Thomas Ulsrud in another rematch of the 2011 World Championships bronze medal game. Norway started out strong and continued to solidify their lead with two crucial steals, but Sweden bounced back with two successive deuces with last rock, tying the game up at 6–6. Ulsrud drew against two Swedish stones in the tenth end to secure Norway their second consecutive championship.

The Group C competitions in Tårnby, Denmark saw Poland and Lithuania advance to the Group B competitions, after Lithuania defeated Turkey in the semifinal. They joined fourteen other teams in Group B to create two groups of eight, and a round robin was held within those groups. Hungary and Russia advanced from the Red Group, and Ireland and England advanced from the Blue Group. Hungary advanced straight to the final after defeating Ireland, while Russia advanced to the semifinal against Ireland after defeating England. Russia won the semifinal over Ireland, sending Ireland to the bronze medal game. England stole a win over Ireland in the bronze medal game, winning with a score of 8–4. The home team Russia proceeded to defeat Hungary to win the Group B competitions. As a result, Russia and Hungary advance to the 2012 Men's Group A competitions, replacing Latvia and Italy, and Belarus and Croatia were relegated to the 2012 Men's Group C competitions.

Group A

Teams

Round-robin standings
Final round-robin standings

Round-robin results

Draw 1
Saturday, December 3, 16:30

Draw 2
Sunday, December 4, 8:00

Draw 3
Sunday, December 4, 16:00

Draw 4
Monday, December 5, 8:00

Draw 5
Monday, December 5, 16:00

Draw 6
Tuesday, December 6, 11:00

Draw 7
Tuesday, December 6, 20:00

Draw 8
Wednesday, December 7, 12:00

Draw 9
Wednesday, December 7, 20:00

World Challenge Games

Challenge 1
Friday, December 9, 20:00

Challenge 2
Saturday, December 10, 9:30

 moves on to the 2012 World Men's Championship.

Tiebreakers

Round 1
Thursday, December 8, 8:00

Round 2
Thursday, December 8, 14:00

Playoffs

Page 1 vs. 2
Thursday, December 8, 20:30

Page 3 vs. 4
Thursday, December 8, 20:30

Semifinal
Friday, December 9, 13:00

Bronze-medal game
Friday, December 9, 20:00

Gold-medal game
Saturday, December 10, 15:00

Group B

Teams

Red Group

Blue Group

Round-robin standings
Final round-robin standings

Round-robin results

Red Group

Draw 1
Saturday, December 3, 7:30

Draw 2
Saturday, December 3, 16:30

Draw 3
Sunday, December 4, 8:00

Draw 4
Sunday, December 4, 16:00

Draw 5
Monday, December 5, 8:00

Draw 6
Monday, December 5, 16:00

Draw 7
Tuesday, December 6, 8:00

*Belarus ran out of time in the 10th end, and officially forfeited the game to Lithuania.

Draw 8
Tuesday, December 6, 16:00

Draw 10
Wednesday, December 7, 16:00

Blue Group

Draw 1
Saturday, December 3, 7:30

Draw 2
Saturday, December 3, 16:30

Draw 3
Sunday, December 4, 8:00

Draw 4
Sunday, December 4, 16:00

Draw 5
Monday, December 5, 8:00

Draw 6
Monday, December 5, 16:00

Draw 7
Tuesday, December 6, 8:00

Draw 8
Tuesday, December 6, 16:00

Draw 9
Wednesday, December 7, 8:00

Relegation game
Thursday, December 8, 8:00

Playoffs

Page R1 vs. B1
Thursday, December 8, 20:00

Page R2 vs. B2
Thursday, December 8, 20:00

Semifinal
Friday, December 9, 8:00

Bronze-medal game
Saturday, December 10, 9:30

Gold-medal game
Friday, December 9, 13:00

 and  advance to the 2012 Group A competitions.

Group C

Teams

Standings
Final round-robin standings

Round-robin results

Draw 1
Friday, September 30, 15:00

Draw 2
Saturday, October 1, 08:00

Draw 3
Saturday, October 1, 16:30

Draw 4
Sunday, October 2, 12:00

Draw 5
Sunday, October 2, 19:30

Draw 6
Monday, October 3, 12:00

Draw 7
Monday, October 3, 19:30

Draw 8
Tuesday, October 4, 8:30

Draw 9
Tuesday, October 4, 16:00

Playoffs
Following the round robin, Poland, the leader of the group, automatically qualified to the Group B competitions in Moscow. The semifinal served as a tiebreaker for the second qualifying spot, which went to Lithuania. Poland and Lithuania were both already qualified to the Group B competitions, but played a gold medal game to determine the winner of the Group C competitions.

Semifinal
Thursday, October 6, 12:00

Gold-medal game
Thursday, October 6, 19:30

 and  advance to the Group B competitions in Moscow.

References

External links
Event Home Page
Results
ECC Group C tournament Home Page

European Curling Championships
2011 in curling